Asterina stipitipodia is a species of fungus in the family Asterinaceae, first described by Marie Leonore Farr in 1987. It  has been found in South America.

References

Asterinidae
Taxa described in 1987
Taxa named by Marie Leonore Farr